The Devils Gate Power Station is a conventional hydroelectric power station located in north-western Tasmania, Australia. It is one of the thinnest concrete arch dams in the world.

Technical details
Part of the MerseyForth scheme that comprises seven hydroelectric power stations, the Devils Gate Power Station is the sixth station in the run-of-river scheme. The power station is located below the double-arched concrete Devils Gate Dam which forms Lake Barrington. Water from the lake is fed to the power station by a  single penstock tunnel.

The station output, estimated to be  annually, is fed to TasNetworks' transmission grid via an 11 kV/110 kV Siemens generator transformer to the outdoor switchyard.

Recreation
Lake Barrington is a world-famous rowing venue that hosted the 1990 World Rowing Championships.

Engineering heritage 
The dam received a  Historic Engineering Marker from Engineers Australia as part of its Engineering Heritage Recognition Program.

See also

 List of power stations in Tasmania

References

Energy infrastructure completed in 1969
Hydroelectric power stations in Tasmania
Northern Tasmania
Recipients of Engineers Australia engineering heritage markers